Lóránt Hajdu (born 12 August 1937, in Bucharest) is a Hungarian composer and pensionary piano and composition teacher.

Life 

Lóránt Hajdu was born in Bucharest, Romania, to a Hungarian family in 1937. In his early childhood they moved to Budapest, Hungary. He studied piano with Clara Chitz and composition with István Szelényi at the Bartók Béla Conservatory in Budapest. He graduated at the Liszt Ferenc Academy of Music in Budapest, where his teacher was Endre Szervánszky.

In 1966 his first Concerto for piano and orchestra won the first prize of the Queen Marie José International Competition. He taught piano and composition at the Leó Weiner Conservatory until 2007. He is founder member of the Alkotó Muzsikusok Társasága (Hungarian Society of Creative Musicians).

Selected works 
Concertante
 Concerto No. 1 for piano and orchestra (1966)
 Concerto No. 2 for piano and orchestra (1972)

Chamber and instrumental music
 Two Movements for viola solo (1974)

Piano
 Bagatelles (1955)
 Sonatina (1955)
 Sonatina on a Hungarian Folk Song (1962)
 3 Etudes (1963)
 3 Rondos (1963)
 Toccata (1972)
 Scherzo-Capriccio (1972)
 10 Easy Piano Pieces (1972)
 Consequences (1976)
 Serial-Game Overture
 15 Little Character Pieces
 Hommage à D. Alberti
 Spinning Top Valse
 4 Little Picture-Etudes

Publishers 
 Editio Musica Budapest
 Zinneberg Musikverlag

References 

1937 births
Living people
Hungarian classical pianists
Male classical pianists
Hungarian composers
Hungarian male composers
Musicians from Bucharest
21st-century classical pianists
21st-century Hungarian male musicians